The Ministry of Resettlement, Rehabilitation and Reconstruction of the Republic of Somaliland (MoRRR)  was a Somaliland government ministry which is responsible for the resettling and rehabilitation of refugees and asylum seekers, as well as the reconstruction of displaced people. The last minister was Ali Said Raygal

See also

 Politics of Somaliland
 Ministry of Presidency
 Ministry of Civil Aviation

References

External links
Official Site of the Government of Somaliland

Government ministries of Somaliland